Pemberton Regional Airport  is a registered aerodrome located  south southeast of Pemberton, British Columbia, Canada. Canadians and a few US pilots practiced landing here, to train for Kandahar, Afghanistan.

Facilities
There is an automatic weather station, but there are no lights, towers or navigational assistance. The runway is not always plowed in winter. There is Jet A fuel and 100LL accessible 24/7 via a card lock system facilitated by Blackcomb Aviation.

Pemberton Regional Airport Authority
Began by the Pemberton Flying Club circa 1970. Oral history states it was based on a post war "back of the envelope" design by Boeing himself. The airport land was a Federal Crown Grant to the town in 1985. The Pemberton Airport Committee underwent several more incarnations before finally being incorporated under the British Columbia Society Act, in 2007 as Pemberton Regional Airport Authority or PRAA. As with all non-profit societies, all funds and/or profits must be used only for the society.

Tenants and resident airlines 
 Coast Range Heliskiing Ltd
 Blackcomb Aviation
 Tyax Adventures. Winter December–May – Ski plane: wheels and skis for landing on a hard surface runway or snow and ice.
 BCFS Fire Attack Base

References

External links
|Pemberton Regional Airport
Page about this airport on COPA's Places to Fly airport directory
 http://www.metcam.navcanada.ca/hb/player.jsp?id=64&cam=148&lang=e

Registered aerodromes in British Columbia
Pemberton Valley
Squamish-Lillooet Regional District